Lars Andreas Larssen (27 March 1935 – 29 January 2014) was a Norwegian stage, film and television actor.

Career 
Larssen was born in the village of Melbu, near Hadsel in Norway. His debut came in 1957, playing a minor role in the blockbuster Nine Lives. He had a larger role in the 1959 film The Master and His Servants, but soon realized that he belonged in the theatre. He began his stage career in 1958 at Folketeatret (The People's Theatre) in Oslo, and went on to become a key figure in establishing the Torshovteatret (Theatre Torshov) as a modern stage theater in the late-1970s. Whilst performing on stage, Larssen also continued to have small roles in films, most notably in the 1983 film Pirates. His best-known television work was as a school principal in the 1989 Norwegian series "Borgen skole", and as Karls former boss, Gundersen, in the first season of Mot i brøstet in 1993. He also played the role of "wise man" in Norway's mid-1990s version of Fort Boyard, Fangene på Fortet.

In 2004, Larssen caused a stir in Norwegian media after publicly criticizing the NRK produced comedy show Team Antonsen for their portrayal of rural Northern Norway, which he described as "mean and hateful". He later withdrew his statements after several northern newspapers called it an "overreaction" and rebuffed his criticism, stating that Larssen was "outdated" in his opinions. Following the controversy, Larssen did a guest appearance on the show, in a satirical portrayal of himself.  Whilst unknown to the public at the time, Larssen was suffering from Alzheimer's disease, and his statements and subsequent actions have later been attributed to the degenerating effects of the disease. He retired from acting in 2003, and appeared in public for the last time in 2005.

In 1962, he and his wife, writer and actress Sonja Lid, established the Peace Office (Fredskontoret) in Stavanger. In the following years peace offices burgeoned in a number of Norwegian cities and towns.

Personal life and death 
Larssen was the father of author Vetle Lid Larssen and filmmaker Gaute Lid Larssen, from his first marriage to Sonja Lid. He later married Thrine Naumann and they had a son, Lars Larssen Naumann, rapper and member of Multicyde. Following his second divorce, Larssen lived with actress Monna Tandberg until a few years before his death.

In August 2007, Tandberg publicly announced that Larssen had been diagnosed with Alzheimer's disease in 2003. Larssen had been struggling to remember his lines in a play, despite performing it several times before, which led him to drop out of the play. She sought to bring public awareness to the disease with this announcement. The illness forced Larssen to retire from acting, and two years later, he stopped appearing in public altogether.

Larssen died in his sleep from Alzheimer's disease on 29 January 2014 at an Oslo nursing home, aged 78.

Partial filmography

 Nine Lives (1957) - Amund, kjelketrekker
 The Master and His Servants (1959) - Leif Helmer
 Douglas (1970)
 Døden i gatene (1970)
 Rødblått paradis (1971) - Fenriken
 Lukket avdeling (1972)
 Kanarifuglen (1973) - Jenssen
 Brannen (1973) - Bærer #2
 Anton (1973) - Wikipedia
 Bortreist på ubestemt tid (1974)
 Faneflukt (1975)
 Kosmetikkrevolusjonen (1977) - Skyggen
 The Carriage Stone (1977) - Læreren
 Desperadosklubben og den mystiske mistenkte (1978) - Reidar, Ottos far
 Pøbel (1978)
 Operasjon Cobra (1978) - Sivil politi på bru 1
 Blood of the Railroad Workers (1979) - Jensa-Jens
 Ingen roser... takk (1979) - Lars
 Kjærleikens ferjereiser (1979)
 Nedtur (1980) - Redaktøren
 The Reward (1980) - Terje
 Martin (1981) - Gymnastikklæreren
 The Witch Hunt (1981) - Glaser
 Sølvmunn (1981) - Mann på fly
 Piratene (1983) - Ordfører
 The Chieftain (1984) - Takstmann
 Noe helt annet (1985) - Forsvarer
 Nattseilere (1986) - Læreren
 The Last Lieutenant (1993) - Bjelland
 Zero Kelvin (1995) - Judge
 Olsenbandens siste stikk (1999) - Politimester

References

External links
 
 Lars Andreas Larssen på sokkel . Larssen's bust unveiled in Melbu (2008).

1935 births
2014 deaths
People from Hadsel
Norwegian male film actors
Norwegian male stage actors
Norwegian male television actors
Deaths from dementia in Norway
Deaths from Alzheimer's disease
20th-century Norwegian male actors
Norwegian Association for Women's Rights people